Martín Sebastián Rivas Fernández (born 17 February 1977) is a former Uruguayan footballer who played as a defender.

Biography
Born in Montevideo, the capital and largest city of Uruguay, he started to play for Danubio then in January 1998 signed by Inter, which he is dual Uruguayan-Spanish citizen, made him not occupy any non-EU quota. He signed a contract until 30 June 2002. Inter also signed countryman Álvaro Recoba earlier that season. On 17 March 1998, he appeared in the 1997–98 UEFA Cup quarterfinal return leg against FC Schalke 04. Inter won in extra time and eventually won the cup. He made his Serie A debut on 16 May 1998 against Empoli.

After a season on loan at Perugia he came back to Inter, but did not manage to make any appearances in 1999–2000 season, although sitting on the bench on several Serie A games.

The following season he was loaned to Málaga, prior to return to Uruguay where he ended his career in 2007, aged 30.

He played 2 caps with his national team and was in the squad of 1997 FIFA Confederations Cup.

Honours
Inter Milan
UEFA Cup: 1997–98

References

External links
Inter Archive
 La Liga career

1977 births
Living people
Footballers from Montevideo
Uruguayan footballers
Uruguay international footballers
Uruguay under-20 international footballers
Uruguayan expatriate footballers
Danubio F.C. players
Peñarol players
Club Atlético River Plate (Montevideo) players
C.A. Bella Vista players
Inter Milan players
UEFA Cup winning players
Uruguayan Primera División players
Serie A players
La Liga players
Expatriate footballers in Italy
Expatriate footballers in Spain
Association football defenders
Málaga CF players
1997 FIFA Confederations Cup players
Uruguayan people of Spanish descent